Hoàng Hồng Cẩm (1959 in Hanoi – 27 October 2011), was a Vietnamese painter. He has exhibited solo paintings in many countries, and continues to paint. he is the son of painter Hoàng Lập Ngôn.

Cam graduated from Hanoi Industrial Fine Arts College in 1983.  He is a member of the Hanoi Fine Arts Association and the Vietnam Fine Arts Association.

Exhibitions
Exhibitions in Hanoi (1991, 1992, 1994, 1996)
"100 Years of Vietnamese Fine Arts," Singapore (1994)
Cicada Gallery, Singapore (1996)
Beijing, China (1996)
Vietnamese Contemporary Fine Arts: "The Winding River," Washington DC, United States (1996)
Sydney, Australia (1998)
Brussels, Belgium, European Union: "Vietnam in 20th Century, Illustrative Arts and Audio Video from 1935 up to now" (1998–2000)
Group Exhibition, "Vietnam Now," Washington DC, USA (2005)

References

1959 births
2011 deaths
People from Hanoi
20th-century Vietnamese painters
21st-century Vietnamese painters